Matchless Mountain is a high mountain summit in the Elk Mountains range of the Rocky Mountains of North America.

Geology
During the Laramide Orogeny the area near Matchless Mountain was lifted and Precambrian basement rocks and overlying Paleozoic sedimentary rock were raised high above nearby valleys. This uplift resulted in particularly dramatic rock deformation in the area of the mountain. Folding and multiple normal and thrust faults riddle the area. After this uplift approximately 65 to 75 million years ago, there was a long period of erosion. The erosion of uplands and the accumulation of sediments  in the valleys largely leveled the landscape. Approximately 30 million years ago, the Precambrian and Paleozoic rocks were intruded by magma resulting in granitic stocks,  dikes, and  sills. Renewed uplift approximately 10 million years ago raised the region to the heights seen today. Forces of erosion by water and ice have since carved the landscape and sculpted the present Matchless Mountain. Included in these erosional forces was Pleistocene glaciation, and glacial deposits fill Dustin Gulch to the north of the mountain.

At the summit of Matchless Mountain are Lower Paleozoic sedimentary rocks, and the lower slopes of the mountain are a mosaic of older Proterozoic (Precambrian) granites and gneiss and younger Pennsylvanian sedimentary rocks of the Belden and Minturn formations along with Middle Tertiary intrusive granitic rocks.

Hiking
The summit can be reached most easily from the west. The Wheelbarrow Gulch Road (Forest Road 746.1A) leads onto the western slope of Matchless Mountain. A hike to the summit can begin where the road ends at an elevation of (.

See also

List of Colorado mountain ranges
List of Colorado mountain summits
List of Colorado fourteeners
List of Colorado 4000 meter prominent summits
List of the most prominent summits of Colorado
List of Colorado county high points

References

External links

 

Mountains of Colorado
Mountains of Gunnison County, Colorado
Gunnison National Forest